Ryan Brookfield (born 10 May 1987) is a semi-professional English footballer who plays as a goalkeeper. He currently plays for City of Liverpool, as well as acting as their goalkeeper coach. Earlier in his career, he played in the Football League for Chester City, also representing Colwyn Bay.

Playing career
Brookfield made one appearance in the Football League for Chester City, when he replaced the injured Chris MacKenzie during a 3–1 defeat at Lincoln City in December 2005. At the end of the season he was released and dropped into non-League football with Colwyn Bay.

He left Colwyn Bay towards the end of the 2006–07 season, and has since played for Waterloo Dock while working as a heat technician. In 2008–09, Brookfield helped Waterloo reach the final of the Liverpool Senior Cup before losing to Liverpool Reserves.

External links

References

1987 births
Living people
Footballers from Liverpool
Association football goalkeepers
English footballers
Chester City F.C. players
Colwyn Bay F.C. players
Waterloo Dock A.F.C. players
English Football League players